The former Briery Mountain Wildlife Management Area was located on  near Kingwood in Preston County, West Virginia. The wildlife management area was part of the Camp Dawson Army Training Center, owned by the West Virginia State Armory Board.  Briery Mountain WMA was sited on Briery Mountain, overlooking Camp Dawson and the Cheat River valley. The land had been cooperatively managed by the WV State Armory Board and the WV Division of Natural Resources.  Construction of a live-fire range forced the permanent closure of the WMA.

Hunting
Hunting is not permitted on the former wildlife area.  Before the ban in 2011, a special, free, annual hunting permit was required from Camp Dawson headquarters to hunt on Briery Mountain.  The area had been occasionally closed when military training exercises are conducted.

See also

Animal conservation
Hunting
List of West Virginia wildlife management areas
National Guard of the United States
Recreational fishing

References

External links
 West Virginia DNR District 1 Wildlife Management Areas
West Virginia Hunting Regulations
West Virginia Fishing Regulations

Wildlife management areas of West Virginia
Protected areas of Preston County, West Virginia